"Hurt You" is a song by Canadian singer-songwriter the Weeknd, featuring French producer Gesaffelstein. Released as the fifth track from the Weeknd's debut extended play My Dear Melancholy (2018), it was written by the Weeknd (Abel Tesfaye), Gesaffelstein (Mike Lévy), Daft Punk's Guy-Manuel de Homem-Christo, and Cirkut, with the latter three producing the track.

Critical reception 
The song received generally mixed to positive reviews from critics. Jordan Bassett of NME referred to the melody of the track as "sliding into in a squealing cacophony of electronic beats, howling synths and sound effects that evoke a ray gun blasting into your heart." While ranking every song on My Dear Melancholy, Michael Saponara of Billboard ranks the song at fourth place; "The second collaboration with Gesaffelstein is reminiscent of classic Abel," says Saponara, "'Hurt You' sees The Weeknd exude his wide-ranging singing abilities here more than any other track on the EP".

Craig Jenkins of Vulture described that the track, in particular the lyric "between your legs, not between your heart", as "feel[ing] like eavesdropping on a gross couples’ squabble teetering between high drama and base chauvinism." Larry Fitzmaurice of Pitchfork stated that "Homem-Cristo and fellow Frenchman Gesaffelstein draw from the same well that produced Starboy’s title track and 'I Feel It Coming,' but fail to match the radiance of either."

Composition and lyrics 
"Hurt You" is an alternative R&B song composed in the key of F major and follows a tempo of 184 beats per minute. In the song's lyrics, Tesfaye warns his partner to keep her distance, as he is, in reality, not fully in love with his partner.

Charts

Certifications

References 

2018 songs
The Weeknd songs
Alternative R&B songs
Songs written by Guy-Manuel de Homem-Christo